Maria Kitkarska (born 13 July 1995 in Blagoevgrad, Bulgaria) is a rhythmic gymnast competing for Canada. She is the 2010 Canadian junior all-around champion and 2012 Canadian Senior all-around champion.

Career 
Kitkarska is the 2010 Canadian junior champion and competed at the 2010 Youth Olympic Games finishing 11th in qualifications. She debuted as a senior in 2011 and has competed at the 2011 World Championships and finished 6th in all-around at the 2011 Pan American Games. She became the Canadian National all-around champion in 2012 and finished second (in 2013, 2014) behind Patricia Bezzoubenko. She competed with Canadian Team (Patricia Bezzoubenko, Annabelle Kovacs) at the 2014 Pacific Rim Championships where they won the Team silver medal. She was member of the Canadian Team that won a gold medal in the team event (with teammates Patricia Bezzoubenko and Annabelle Kovacs) at the 2014 Commonwealth Games in Glasgow. Kitkarska finished 7th in the all-around finals. She completed her career at the end of the 2014 season.

Personal life
Kitkarska speaks three languages French, Bulgarian, English

References

External links
 
 
 
 

1995 births
Living people
Bulgarian emigrants to Canada
Canadian people of Bulgarian descent
Canadian rhythmic gymnasts
Commonwealth Games gold medallists for Canada
Commonwealth Games medallists in gymnastics
Gymnasts at the 2010 Summer Youth Olympics
Gymnasts at the 2014 Commonwealth Games
Gymnasts from Montreal
Sportspeople from Blagoevgrad
Medallists at the 2014 Commonwealth Games